iArchiver is a software utility for handling file archives on the Apple Macintosh. It was renamed Rucksack, and then simply "Archiver".

iArchiver was designed as a universal tool for working with archives, and can be used to create, extract and convert a large number of common and legacy archive formats with a drag-and-drop interface.

With iArchiver you can: create Zip, DMG, 7-zip, Tar, Gzip, Bzip2, Z and CPIO archives open Zip, RAR, ARJ, LhA, StuffIt, hqx, rpm, PAX, and many other common and not so common formats convert archives from one format to another for example from RAR to ZIP or from StuffIt to DMG.

iArchiver was developed and is currently being maintained by Dare to be Creative Ltd, a software company based in Vienna, Austria.

Features 
 Creating archives in formats common on Apple Macintosh, Microsoft Windows and Linux platforms including zip, DMG, 7-zip and TAR
 Encrypting archives in zip and 7-zip format
 Opening archives in both common and legacy formats such as zip, DMG, 7-zip and TAR, RAR, ACE, ARJ, Cabinet, SIT, HQX and PAX files
 Converting between archive formats, for example converting RAR files to ZIP format or from SIT to DMG

See also 
Comparison of file archivers

External links 
 iArchiver website

MacOS archivers and compression-related utilities
File archivers